Muhammad Ayub Khan (14 May 1907 – 19 April 1974), was the second President of Pakistan. He was an army general who seized the presidency from Iskander Mirza in a coup in 1958, the first successful coup d'état in the country's history. Popular demonstrations and labour strikes supported by the protests in East Pakistan ultimately led to his forced resignation in 1969. During his presidency, differences between West and East Pakistan arose to an enormous degree, that ultimately led to the Independence of Bangladesh following the Bangladesh Liberation War.

Trained at the British Royal Military College, Ayub Khan fought in World War II as a colonel in the British Indian Army before deciding to transfer to the Pakistan Army in the aftermath of the partition of India in 1947. His assignments included command of the 14th Division in East-Bengal. He was elevated to become the first native Commander-in-Chief of the Pakistan Army in 1951 by Prime Minister Liaquat Ali Khan, succeeding General Douglas Gracey. From 1953 to 1958, he served in the civilian government as Defence and Home Minister and supported President Iskander Mirza's decision to impose martial law against Prime Minister Feroze Khan's administration in 1958. Two weeks later, he took over the presidency from Mirza after a breakdown in civil-military relations between him and Mirza.

Upon taking power, he appointed General Musa Khan as Commander-in-Chief in 1958 to replace him in that role. He aligned Pakistan with the United States, and allowed American access to air bases inside Pakistan, most notably the airbase outside of Peshawar, from which spy missions over the Soviet Union were launched. Relations with neighboring China were strengthened but his alignment with the US worsened relations with the Soviet Union in 1962. He launched Operation Gibraltar against India in 1965, leading to all-out war. However, with Soviet Union intervention in 1966, peace was negotiated and relations among the three nations improved.

Domestically, Ayub subscribed to the laissez-faire policy of Western-aligned nations at the time. He privatized state-owned industries, and liberalized the economy generally. Large inflows of foreign aid and investment led to the fastest-growing economy in South Asia. His tenure was also distinguished by the completion of hydroelectric stations, dams, and reservoirs. Under Ayub, Pakistan's space program was established, and the country launched its first unmanned space-mission by 1962. However, the failure of land reforms and a weak taxation system meant that most of this growth landed in the hands of the elite.

In 1965, Ayub Khan entered the presidential race as the Pakistan Muslim League (PML) candidate to counter the popular and famed non-partisan Fatima Jinnah and was controversially reelected for a second term. He was faced with allegations of widespread intentional vote riggings, organizing political murders in Karachi, worsening the already-weak legitimacy of his regime after the peace with India, which many Pakistanis considered an embarrassing compromise. In 1967, wide disapproval of price hikes of food prompted demonstrations across the country led by Zulfikar Ali Bhutto. Ayub Khan dramatically fell from power in 1969 amid a popular uprising in East Pakistan led by Sheikh Mujibur Rahman. He was forced to resign to avoid further protests, and appointed Yahya Khan his successor to oversee elections. He fought a brief illness and died in 1974.

His legacy remains mixed; he is credited with ostensible economic prosperity and what supporters dub the "decade of development" by bringing an industrial and agricultural revolution to the country, but is criticized for beginning the first of the intelligence agencies' incursions into national politics, for concentrating wealth in a corrupt few hands, and segregated policies that later led to the armed conflict that resulted in the creation of Bangladesh.

Early life 

Ayub Khan was born on 14 May 1907 in Rehana, a village in Abbottabad District of the North-West Frontier Province of British India (now in Haripur District, Khyber Pakhtunkhwa, Pakistan) into the Tareen tribe of Pashtuns.

He was the first child of the second wife of Mir Dad Khan, a Risaldar-Major (a regimental JCO which was then known as VCO) in the 9th Hodson's Horse which was a cavalry regiment of the British Indian Army. For his basic education, he was enrolled in a school in Sarai Saleh, which was about 4 miles from his village. He used to go to school on a mule's back and was shifted to a school in Haripur, where he started living with his grandmother.

He went on to study at Aligarh Muslim University (AMU) and  while pursuing his college education, he was accepted into the Royal Military College at Sandhurst by the recommendation of General Andrew Skeen; he did not complete his degree at AMU and departed for Great Britain. Ayub Khan was fluent in Urdu, Pashto, English, and his regional Northern Hindko dialect.

Military career 

Ayub Khan joined the Royal Military College, Sandhurst, as a trainee in July 1926. He was commissioned as a 2nd Lt. on 2 February 1928 in the 1/14th Punjab Regiment (1st Battalion of the 14th Punjab Regiment) of the British Indian Army – before this he was attached to the Royal Fusiliers.  Amongst those who passed out with him was the future chief of army staff of the Indian Army, General Joyanto Nath Chaudhuri, who served as the army chief from 1962 to 1966 while Ayub was the president of Pakistan. After the standard probationary period of service in the British Army, he was appointed to the British Indian Army on 10 April 1929, joining the 1/14th Punjab Regiment Sherdils, now known as the 5th Punjab Regiment.

He was promoted to lieutenant on 2 May 1930 and to captain on 2 February 1937. During World War II, he was promoted to the temporary rank of lieutenant-colonel in 1942 and was posted in Burma to participate in the first phase of the Burma Campaign in 1942–43. He was promoted to the permanent rank of major on 2 February 1945. Later that year, he was promoted to temporary colonel and assumed the command of his own regiment in which he was commissioned to direct operations in the second phase of the Burma Campaign; however, he was soon temporarily suspended without pay from that command for visible cowardice under fire.

In 1946, he was posted back to British India and was stationed in the North-West Frontier Province. In 1947, he was promoted to brigadier and commanded a brigade in mountainous South Waziristan. When the United Kingdom announced the partition of British India into India and Pakistan, he was one of the most senior serving officers in the British Indian Army who opted for Pakistan in 1947. At the time of his joining, he was the tenth ranking officer in terms of seniority with service number PA-010.

In the early part of 1948, he was given the command of the 14th Infantry Division in the rank of acting major-general stationed in Dacca, East Pakistan. In 1949, he was decorated with the Hilal-i-Jurat (HJ) by Prime Minister Liaquat Ali Khan for non-combatant service and called back to General Headquarters as the Adjutant General of the army on November of the same year.

Commander-in-chief of the Pakistan Army 

General Sir Douglas Gracey relinquished the command of the Pakistan Army on 23 January 1951, under pressure of calls for "nationalisation" of the army. The Pakistan government already called for appointing native commanders-in-chief of the army, air force, and navy and dismissed deputation appointments from the British military. The General Headquarters sent the nomination papers to the Prime Minister's Secretariat for the appointment of commander-in-chief. There were four-senior officers in the race: Major-General Akbar Khan, Major-General Iftikhar Khan, Major-General Ishfakul Majid, and Major-General N.A.M. Raza, and among these officers Akbar was the senior-most as he was commissioned in 1920.

Initially, Gen. Iftikhar Khan (commissioned in 1929) was selected for appointment as the first native commander-in-chief of the army, but he died in an airplane crash en route to take command after finishing the senior staff officers' course in the United Kingdom. All three remaining generals were bypassed including the recommended senior-most Major-General Akbar Khan and Major-General Ishfakul Majid (commissioned in 1924).

Defence Secretary Iskandar Mirza, at that time, played a crucial role in lobbying for the army post selection as presenting with convincing arguments to Prime Minister Ali Khan to promote the junior-most Major-General Ayub Khan (commissioned in 1928) to the post despite the fact that his name was not included in the nomination list. Ayub's papers of promotion were approved and he was appointed the first native commander-in-chief of the Pakistan Army on 17 January 1951 by Prime Minister Ali Khan.

Ayub's becoming the commander in chief of the Pakistan Army marked a change in the military tradition to one of preferring native Pakistanis; it ended the transitional role of British military officers. Although the Pakistani government announced the appointment of the navy's native commander in chief in 1951, it was Ayub Khan who helped Vice-Admiral M.S. Choudhri to be appointed as the first native navy commander in chief, also in 1953. The events surrounding Ayub's appointment set the precedent for a native general being promoted out of turn, ostensibly because he was the least ambitious of the generals in the line of promotion and the most loyal to civil government at that time. Ayub, alongside Admiral Choudhri, cancelled and disbanded the British military tradition in the navy and the army when the U.S. military's advisers were dispatched to the Pakistani military in 1955–57. British military traditions were only kept in the air force due to a British commander and major staff consisting of Royal Air Force officers.

In 1953, Ayub visited Turkey, his first foreign visit as an army commander in chief, and was said to have been impressed with Turkish military tradition; he met only with the Turkish Defence minister during his visit. Thereafter, he went to the United States and visited the US State Department and Pentagon to lobby for forging military relations. He termed this visit as a "medical visit" but made a strong plea for military aid which was not considered due to India's opposition.

Cabinet and Defence Minister 

On 24 February 1954, Ayub signed the Central Treaty Organization (CENTO) pact for Pakistan and his role in national politics, along with that of Defense Minister Mirza, began to grow

In 1954, Prime Minister Muhammad Ali Bogra's relations with the military and Governor-General Ghulam Muhammad deteriorated on issues of the economy. Pressure built up to reconstruct the cabinet which eventually witnessed General Ayub Khan becoming the defence minister and Iskander Mirza as home minister in October 1954. Ayub Khan disdained civilian politicians, whose factional infighting had for years prevented adoption of a constitution. He wrote that he reluctantly joined the cabinet as defence minister with "two clear objectives: to save the armed forces from the interference of the politicians, and to unify the provinces of West Pakistan into one unit."

The controversial One Unit Scheme integrated the four western provinces into one political entity, West Pakistan, as a counterbalance against the numerically superior population of East Bengal, which was renamed East Pakistan. The province of Punjab supported the project, but all the other provinces protested against it and its centralisation of power. Opposition was particularly strong in East Bengal, where it was seen as an attack on the democratic principle of political egalitarianism.

In 1955, Prime Minister Bogra was dismissed by Governor-General Malik Ghulam Muhammad and he was succeeded by the new Prime Minister Chaudhry Muhammad Ali as the Defence Minister.

After the 1954 provincial elections in East Pakistan, the Awami League formed the government there while West Pakistan was governed by the PML, but the PML government collapsed in 1956. He was called on to join the Cabinet as Defence Minister by Prime Minister H.S. Suhrawardy and maintained closer relations with Iskander Mirza who now had become the first President of the country after the successful promulgation of the Constitution in 1956. In 1957, President Mirza promoted him from acting full general to the substantive rank of full general.

Around this time the MoD, led by General Ayub Khan, began to see the serious interservice rivalry between the General Headquarters staff and the Naval Headquarters staff. Commander in Chief of Navy Vice-Admiral M. S. Choudri and his NHQ staff had been fighting with the Finance ministry and the MoD over the issues of rearmament and contingency plans. Meanwhile, he continued to serve with Prime Minister Chundrigar and Feroz Noon's government as Defence Minister.

In 1958, he chaired the joint military meeting where he became involved in a heated discussion with Admiral M. S. Choudri. He reportedly complained against Admiral Choudri to President Mirza and criticized Admiral Choudri for "neither having the brain, imagination, or depth of thought to understand such (defence) problems nor the vision or the ability to make any contribution". The impasse was broken with Admiral Choudhri resigning from the navy in protest as a result of having differences with the navy's plans of expansion and modernization. In 1958, Vice-Admiral Afzal Rahman Khan, who was known to be a confidant of General Ayub Khan, was appointed as naval chief by President Mirza.

President of Pakistan (1958–1969) 

Under threat of being dismissed, Prime Minister H.S. Suhrawardy resigned and Prime Minister I.I. Chundiragar took over the post but in a mere two months he too tendered his resignation after losing a vote of no confidence in the National Assembly. The Constituent Assembly then elected Sir Feroz Noon for the post of the prime minister; Noon had much wider support from the western Republican Party, the eastern Awami League, and the Krishak Sramik.

This new alliance threatened President Iskander Mirza because Suhrawardy and Feroz began campaigning to become prime minister and president in the upcoming general elections. The conservative Pakistan Muslim League, led by its President A.Q. Khan, was also gaining momentum in West Pakistan and threatened for the Dharna movement. These events were against President Mirza hence he was willing to dissolve even Pakistan's One Unit for his advantage.

At midnight on 7 October 1958, President Mirza ordered a mass mobilization of the Pakistan Armed Forces and abrogated the Constitution after sending a letter to Prime Minister Feroz and the Constituent Assembly about the coup d'état.  Most of the country's politicians only became aware of the coup the next morning; only U.S. Ambassador James Langley and the British High Commissioner were kept fully informed of political developments in the country. President Mirza appointed General Ayub chief martial law administrator (CMLA), who then declared martial law.

Ayub justified his part by declaring that: "History would never have forgiven us if the present chaotic conditions were allowed to go on any further," and his goal was to restore a democracy that the "people can understand and work", not to rule indefinitely. When the public was informed, public reactions were mixed. The immediate crackdown on smuggling, corruption, and trafficking won Ayub plenty of support from the commoners. The middle-class and the upper-middle class were more apprehensive.

President Mirza himself was apprehensive, though for a different reason. He had been contemplating replacing Ayub Khan, and it seems that Ayub knew. Immediately after the Supreme Court's Chief Justice Munir justified the coup under the doctrine of necessity, Ayub sent the military into the presidential palace and exiled Mirza to England. This was largely done with the support of: Admiral A. R. Khan, General Azam Khan, Nawab of Kalabagh Amir Khan, General Dr. Wajid Khan, and Air Marshal Asghar Khan.

The regime came to power with the intent of instituting widespread reform. Like Mirza, Ayub advocated for greater centralization of power, and his ruling style was more American than British. He "vowed to give people access to speedier justice, curb the crippling birth rate, and take appropriate steps, including land reforms and technological innovation, to develop agriculture so that the country could feed itself".

Ayub finally "restored civil administration", although he maintained the Presidency and relied on an intricate web of spy agencies to maintain supremacy over the bureaucracy, including calling upon civilian intelligence agencies.

In 1960, a referendum, that functioned as the Electoral College, was held that asked the general public: "Do you have confidence in Muhammad Ayub Khan?". The voter turnout was recorded at 95.6% and such confirmation was used as impetus to formalise the new system – a presidential system. Ayub Khan was elected president for the next five years and decided to pay his first state visit to the United States with his wife and also daughter Begum Naseem Aurangzeb in July 1961. Highlights of his visit included a state dinner at Mount Vernon, a visit to the Islamic Center of Washington, and a ticker tape parade in New York City.

Constitutional and legal reforms

A Constitutional Commission was set-up under the Supreme Court to implement the work on the Constitution that was led by Chief Justice Muhammad Shahabuddin and Supreme Court justices. The commission reported in 1961 with its recommendations but President Ayub remained unsatisfied; he eventually altered the constitution so that it was entirely different from the one recommended by the Shahabuddin Commission. The Constitution reflected his personal views of politicians and the restriction of using religions in politics. His presidency restored the writ of government through the promulgated constitution and restored political freedom by lifting the martial law enforced since 1958.

The new Constitution respected Islam, but did not declare Islam as the state religion and was viewed as a liberal constitution. It also provided for election of the president by 80,000 (later raised to 120,000) Basic Democrats who could theoretically make their own choice but who were essentially under his control. He justified this as analogous to the American Electoral College and cited Thomas Jefferson as his inspiration. The Ayub administration "guided" the print newspapers through his takeover of key opposition papers and, while Ayub Khan permitted a National Assembly, it had only limited powers.

On 2 March 1961, he passed and signed the "Muslim Family Laws" bill through the ordinance under which unmitigated polygamy was abolished, consent of the current wife was made mandatory for a second marriage, brakes were also placed on the practice of instant divorce where men could divorce women by saying:"I divorce you" three times under Islamic tradition.

The Arbitration Councils were set up under the law in the urban and rural areas to deal with cases of: (a) grant of sanction to a person to contract a second marriage during the subsistence of a marriage; (b) reconciliation of a dispute between a husband and a wife; (c) grant of a maintenance allowance to the wife and children.

Economy and infrastructure

Industrialization and rural development through constructing modern national freeways are considered his greatest achievements and his era is remembered for successful industrialization in the impoverished country. Strong emphasis on capitalism and foreign direct investment (FDI) in the industry is often regarded as the "Great Decade" in the history of the country (both economical and political history). The "Great Decade" was celebrated, which highlighted the development plans executed during the years of Ayub's rule, the private consortium companies and industries, and is credited with creating an environment where the private sector was encouraged to establish medium and small-scale industries in Pakistan. This opened up avenues for new job opportunities and thus the economic graph of the country started rising. He oversaw the development and completion of mega projects such as hydroelectric dams, power stations, and barrages all over the country. During 1960–66, the annual GDP growth was recorded at 6.8%.

Several hydroelectric projects were completed, including the Mangla Dam (one of the world's largest dams), several small dams and water reservoirs in West Pakistan, and one dam in East Pakistan, the Kaptai Dam. President Ayub authorized planning of nuclear power plants, overriding the concerns of his own finance minister, Muhammad Shoaib, about their cost. Initially, two nuclear power plants were to be established in the country: one in Karachi and the other in Dhaka. Dr. Abdus Salam. supported by the President, personally approved the project in Karachi while the project in East Pakistan never materialized.

Extensive education reforms were supposedly carried out and 'scientific development efforts' were also supposedly made during his years. These policies could not be sustained after 1965, when the economy collapsed and led to economic declines which he was unable to control.

Ayub introduced new curricula and textbooks for universities and schools. Many public-sector universities and schools were built during his era.  He also introduced agricultural reforms preventing anyone from occupying more than 500 acres of irrigated and 1000 acres of unirrigated land. An oil refinery was established in Karachi. These reforms led to 15% GNP growth of the country that was three times greater than that of India. Despite the increase in the GNP growth, the profit and revenue was gained by the famous 22 families of the time that controlled 66% of the industries and land of the country and 80% of the banking and insurance companies of Pakistan.

Defence spending

During the Ayub era, the navy was able to introduce submarines and slowly modified itself by acquiring warships. However, Ayub drastically reduced funding of the military in the 1950s and de-prioritized nuclear weapons in the 1960s. The military relied on donations from the United States for major weapons procurements. Major funding was made available for military acquisitions and procurement towards conventional weaponry for conventional defence. In the 1960s, the Pakistani military acquired Americanproduced conventional weapons such as Jeep CJs, M48 Patton and M24 Chaffee tanks, M16 rifles, F-86 fighter airplanes, and the submarine PNS Ghazi; all through the US Foreign Military Sales program. In 1961, President Ayub started the nation's fullfledged space program in cooperation with the air force, and created the Suparco civilian space agency that launched sounding rockets throughout the 1960s.

Ayub directed Pakistan's nuclear technology efforts towards electrical power generation, disregarding recommendations to use it for military purposes. He reportedly spent ₨. 721 million on civilian nuclear power plants and related education of engineers and scientists.

Ayub Khan filled more and more civil administrative positions with army officers, increasing the military's influence over the bureaucracy. He expanded the size of the army by more than half from the early 1960s to 1969, and maintained a high level of military spending as a percentage of GDP during that period, peaking in the immediate aftermath of the Indo-Pakistani War of 1965.

Foreign policy

U.S. alliance and 1960 U-2 incident

The main feature of Ayub Khan's foreign policy was prioritized relations with the United States and Europe.  Foreign relations with the Soviet Union were downplayed. He enjoyed support from President Dwight Eisenhower in the 1950s and, working with Prime Minister Ali Khan, forged a military alliance with the United States against regional communism. His obsession towards modernization of the armed forces in the shortest time possible saw relations with the United States as the only way to achieve his organizational and personal objectives as he argued against civilian supremacy that would affect American interests in the region as a result of an election.

The Central Intelligence Agency leased Peshawar Air Station in the 1950s and spying into the Soviet Union from the air station grew immensely, with Ayub's full knowledge, during his presidency.  When these activities were exposed in 1960 after a U-2 flying out of the air station was shot down and its pilot captured by the USSR, President Ayub was in the United Kingdom on a state visit. When the local CIA station chief briefed President Ayub on the incident, Ayub shrugged his shoulders and said that he had expected this would happen at some point.

The resulting Soviet ire severely compromised the national security of Pakistan. Ayub Khan had to publicly offer his apologies to the Soviet Union after USSR Secretary General Nikita Khrushchev made a threat to bomb Peshawar. President Ayub directed his Foreign Office to reduce tensions with the Soviet Union by facilitating state visits by Soviet Premier Kosygin and Soviet Foreign Minister Gromyko and agreeing to downplay relations with the United States.

In 1963, Ayub signed the historic Sino-Pakistan Frontier Agreement with China despite US opposition.

During 1961–65, Ayub lost much of his support from President John Kennedy and President Lyndon Johnson as they sought closer relations with India.  President Johnson placed an embargo on both nations during the war in 1965. Relations with the Soviet Union were eventually normalized when the Soviets facilitated a peace treaty between Pakistan and India in 1965, and reached a trade treaty with Pakistan the following year. In 1966–67, Ayub wrestled with the United States' attempt to dictate Pakistan's foreign policy, while he strengthened relations with the Soviet Union and China. Despite initiatives to normalize relations with the Soviet Union, Ayub Khan remained inclined towards the United States and the western world, receiving President Johnson in Karachi in 1967.

In 1961–62, Ayub paid a state visit to the United Kingdom.  He attracted much attention from the British public when his involvement in the Christine Keeler affair was revealed.

India: 1959 joint defence and 1965 war

In 1959, Ayub Khan's interest in building defence forces had already diminished when he made an offer of joint defense with India during the Sino-Indo clashes in October 1959 in Ladakh, in a move seen as a result of American pressure and a lack of understanding of foreign affairs Upon hearing this proposal, India's Prime Minister Nehru reportedly countered, "Defence Minister Ayub: Joint Defence on what?" India remained uninterested in such proposals and Prime Minister Nehru decided to push his country's role in the Non-Aligned Movement. In 1960, President Ayub, together with Prime Minister Nehru, signed the Indus Waters Treaty brokered by the World Bank. In 1962, after India was defeated by China, Ayub Khan disguised a few thousand soldiers as guerillas and sent them to Indian Kashmir to incite the people to rebel. In 1964, the Pakistan Army engaged with the Indian Army in several skirmishes, and clandestine operations began.

The war with India in 1965 was a turning point in his presidency, and it ended in a settlement reached by Ayub Khan at Tashkent, called the Tashkent Declaration, which was facilitated by the Soviet Union. The settlement was perceived negatively by many Pakistanis and led Foreign Minister Zulfiqar Ali Bhutto to resign his post and take up opposition to Ayub Khan. According to Morrice James, "For them (Pakistanis) Ayub had betrayed the nation and had inexcusably lost face before the Indians."

According to Sartaj Aziz, deputy chairman of the Planning Commission, it was Foreign Minister Bhutto who had inadvertently set Pakistan on the road to war with India. During a cabinet meeting, Bhutto had gone on a populist anti-Indian and anti-American binge and succeeded in spellbinding President Ayub into thinking he was becoming a world statesman fawned upon by the enemies of the United States. When Ayub authorized Operation Gibraltar, the fomenting of an  Kashmiri insurgency against India, Aziz famously told the President: "Sir, I hope you realize that our foreign policy and our economic requirements are not fully consistent, in fact they are rapidly falling out of line". Aziz opposed Operation Gibraltar, fearing the economical turmoil that would jolt the country's economy, but was in turn opposed by his own senior bureaucrats. In that meeting, Foreign Minister Bhutto convinced the president and the finance minister Muhammad Shoaib that India would not attack Pakistan due to Kashmir being a disputed territory, and per Bhutto's remarks: "Pakistan's incursion into Indian-occupied Kashmir, at [A]khnoor, would not provide [India] with the justification for attacking Pakistan across the international boundary because Kashmir was a disputed territory". This theory proved wrong when India launched a full-scale war against West Pakistan in 1965.

His army C-in-C General Musa Khan did not order the Pakistan Army to respond without the confirmation by President Ayub Khan despite Foreign Minister Bhutto's urging  However, after the Indian Army advanced towards the Rann of Kutch, General Musa Khan ordered the army to respond against the opposing force. He faced serious altercations with, and public criticism from, air chief AM Asghar Khan for hiding the details of the war. The Air AHQ began fighting the president over the contingency plans, and this inter-services rivalry ended with Asghar Khan's resignation. To reduce interservices tensions and criticism, navy commander Admiral A. R. Khan authorised the shelling of coastal Indian Navy posts at Dwarka, India.

About the 1965 war's contingency plans, AM Nur Khan briefly wrote that "Rumours about an impending operation were rife but the army had not shared the plans with other forces."

Ayub Khan's main sponsor, the United States, did not welcome the move and the Johnson administration placed an economic embargo that caused Pakistan to lose US$500 million in aid and grants that had been received through consortium. Ayub Khan could not politically survive in the aftermath of the 1965 war with India and fell from the presidency after surrendering presidential power to Army Commander General Yahya in 1969. 

Afghanistan: Afghanistan-Pakistan Confederation Plan

In the 1950's, partly due to the complicated bilateral relations between Afghanistan and Pakistan over the Durand line dispute, Ayub Khan along with the Royal family of Afghanistan under King Zahir Shah proposed the Afghanistan-Pakistan Confederation Plan to merge Afghanistan with Pakistan under a single confederation. This merger was proposed on the basis of mutual distrust and fears of security threats by the Indian government and the Soviets, which wasn't able to amount to fruition due to the eventual Soviet invasion of Afghanistan and the formation of a new communist Afghan regime.

End of his presidency

Presidential election of 1965 

In 1964, President Ayub Khan was confident in his apparent popularity and saw the deep divisions within the political opposition which ultimately led him to announce presidential elections in 1965. He earned the nomination of the Pakistan Muslim League (PML) and was shocked when Fatima Jinnah was nominated by the Combined Opposition Parties.

Fatima Jinnah had gained a lot of support from Karachi, Lahore, and various parts of West and East Pakistan opposed to President Ayub Khan. Jinnah targeted the Indus Waters Treaty, Pakistan's over-reliance on the United States, and its troubled relations with the Soviet Union. During the elections, President Ayub earned notoriety when his son, Gohar Ayub Khan, was named in the news media for authorizing political murders in Karachi, particularly of Jinnah supporters.

Angry protesters demonstrated in the streets of Sindh, chanting slogans against President Ayub. Fatima Jinnah won the popular vote in a landslide but Ayub Khan won the election through the Electoral College vote. During this time, Ayub Khan used the Pakistani intelligence community for his own advantage. Military Intelligence actively monitored politicians and political gatherings and the Intelligence Bureau taped politicians' telephone conversations. This was the first departure of the intelligence community from national defence and security to direct interference with national politics, an interference which continued in succeeding years.

It was reported that the elections were widely rigged by the state authorities and machinery under the control of Ayub Khan and it is believed that had the elections been held via direct ballot, Fatima Jinnah would have won. The Electoral College consisted of only 80,000 Basic Democrats. They were easily manipulated by President Ayub Khan, who won the bitterly-contested elections with 64% of the Electoral College vote. According to journalists of the time, the election did not conform to international standards; many viewed the election results with great suspicion.

1969 nationwide riots and resignation 

The controversial victory over Fatima Jinnah in the 1965 presidential election and the outcome of the war with India in the same year brought devastating results for Ayub Khan's image and his presidency. Upon returning from Tashkent, Foreign Minister Bhutto went to the television media and criticized President Ayub for selling the nation's honor and sacrifice, which prompted President Ayub to depose Bhutto. In Karachi, public resentment towards Ayub had been rising since the 1965 elections and his policies were widely disapproved.

In 1967, Zulfikar Ali Bhutto formed the socialist Pakistan Peoples Party (PPP) and embarked on a nationwide tour where he attacked the Ayub administration's economic, religious, and social policies. The detention of Bhutto further inflamed the opposition and demonstrations were sparked all over the country with the East Pakistani Awami League charging the Ayub administration with segregating policies towards the East. Labour unions called for labour strikes against Ayub Khan's labour legislation and dissatisfaction was widespread in the country's middle class by the end of 1968. When Ayub Khan was confronted with the Six Point movement led by Sheikh Mujibur Rahman and with the criticism by Bhutto's PPP, he responded by imprisoning both leaders but that made matters worse for Ayub's administration. Left-wing parties, allied with the conservative masses, began advocating for the Islamic parliamentary democracy system against his presidential rule.

In 1968, he survived an assassination attempt while visiting Dacca and was visibly shaken afterwards, according to close aides; though this was not reported in the press of the day.

In 1969, Ayub Khan opened negotiations with the opposition parties in what was termed as a "Round Table Conference" where he held talks with every opposition party except for the Awami League and the Pakistan Peoples Party.  However, these discussions yielded no results and strong anti-Ayub demonstrations calling for his resignation were sparked all over the country. During this time, Ayub Khan survived a near-fatal cardiac arrest that put him out of the office, and later survived a paralysis attack that put him in a wheelchair. The police were unable to maintain law and order in the country, especially in East Pakistan where riots and a serious uprising were quelled. At one point, Home and Defence Minister Vice-Admiral Rahman told journalists that the "country was under the Mob rule and that Police were not strong enough to tackle the situation".

The PPP also led very strong protests, street demonstrations, and riots against the Ayub Khan's administration when the prices of food consumer products such as sugar, tea, and wheat, hiked up. Disapproval of Ayub Khan was widely expressed by chanted slogans and insults referring to him. On the streets of major cities of West Pakistan, massive wall chalkings that employed derogatory and pejorative terms for Ayub made headlines in the print and broadcast media. Ayub Khan himself was shocked upon hearing that young protesters and college students in West had been referring him to as "Dog". According to a Dawn editorial in 2014, it was the first time in the country's history when derogatory language was used against its politicians.

Elements in the military began supporting the opposition political parties; it was this that finally brought about the demise of Ayub Khan's era.  On 25 March 1969, President Ayub Khan, after consulting Advocate Raja Muhammad Qalib Ali Khan (the last person to meet the president before resignation) resigned from office and invited commander-in-chief of the army General Yahya Khan to take over control of the country.

Death and legacy 

Ayub Khan did not comment on the Bangladesh Liberation War in 1971. He died of a heart attack on 19 April 1974 at his villa near Islamabad.

Ayub Khan's presidency allied Pakistan with the American-led military alliance against the Soviet Union which helped Pakistan develop its strong economic background and its long-term political and strategic relations with the United States. Major economic aid and trade from the United States and European Communities ultimately led Pakistan's industrial sector to develop rapidly but the consequences of cartelization included increased inequality in the distribution of wealth. After 1965, he became extremely concerned about the arrogance and bossiness of the US over the direction of Pakistan's foreign policy when the US publicly criticized Pakistan for building ties with China and Soviet Union; he authored a book over this issue known as Friends not Masters.

Ayub Khan began his diary in September 1966, and ended his record in October 1972, because of his failing health. The diary covers events such as his resignation from office, assumption of power by Yahya Khan, the independence of Bangladesh, and the replacement of Yahya by Zulfiqar Ali Bhutto. After his death in 1972, the diary was not released to the public for thirty years due to opinions which would have been detrimental to the reputation of powerful individuals at the time. Ayub Khan wanted his diary to be edited by Altaf Gauhar but after Ayub Khan's death the six-year-long diary was entrusted to Oxford University Press (OUP) to edit and publish. At OUP, Diaries of Field Marshal Mohammad Ayub Khan, 1966-1972 was edited and annotated by Craig Baxter.

The federal capital was relocated under the Ayub administration from the port city of Karachi to the new and carefully planned city of Islamabad in the mountains. Facilitated by the World Bank, the Ayub administration became a party to the Indus Waters Treaty with archrival India to resolve disputes regarding the sharing of the waters of the six rivers in the Punjab Doab that flow between the two countries. Khan's administration also built a major network of irrigation canals, high-water dams, and thermal and hydroelectric power stations.

He subsidized fertilizers and modernized agriculture through irrigation development and spurred industrial growth with liberal tax benefits. In the decade of his rule, the GNP rose by 45% and manufactured goods began to overtake such traditional exports as jute and cotton. However, the economists in the Planning Commission alleged that his policies were tailored to reward the elite families and major landowners in the country. In 1968, his administration celebrated the so-called "Decade of Development" when the mass protests erupted all over the country due to an increasingly greater divide between the rich and the poor.

Criticism, personal wealth, and family

After 1965, the corruption in government, nepotism, and suppression of free speech, thought, and press increased unrest and turmoil in the country against the Ayub administration. The 1965 presidential election, where Ayub Khan was opposed by Fatima Jinnah, was allegedly rigged. In 2003, the nephew of the Quaid-i-Azam, Akbar Pirbhai, re-ignited the controversy by suggesting that Fatima Jinnah's death in 1967 was an assassination by the Ayub Khan establishment. Gohar Ayub Khan became the subject of criticism by many writers when he was accused of leading a victory parade after the 1965 election right into the heartland of opposition territory in Karachi in a blatantly provocative move. The civil administration's failure to stop the rally led to fierce clashes between opposing groups with many locals being killed.

Gohar Ayub Khan also faced criticisms during that time on questions of family corruption and cronyism through his business links with his father-in-law, retired Lieutenant General Habibullah Khan Khattak. One Western commentator in 1969 estimated Gohar Ayub's personal wealth at the time at $4 million, while his family's wealth was put in the range of $10–20 million. Public criticism of Gohar's personal wealth and that of the President increased. All these criticisms harmed President Ayub Khan's image.

He is also blamed for not doing enough to tackle the significant economic disparity between East and West Pakistan. Whilst he was aware of the acute grievances of East Pakistan, he did try to address the situation. However, the Ayub Khan regime was so highly centralized that, in the absence of democratic institutions, densely populated and politicized East Pakistan province continued to feel it was being slighted.

After his death, his descendants became active in national politics in the 1990s until the present; however, these family members have been controversial. His son Gohar is an active member of the conservative PML(N) and was the Foreign Minister in the Sharif ministry in the 1990s but was removed due to his controversial and unauthorized statements about India. His daughter Nasim did not enter politics and married Miangul Aurangzeb, the Wali of Swat.

His son Shaukat was a successful businessman and had four children, three sons, and one daughter. All three sons went into business and politics, with Akbar, Arshad, and Yousaf Ayub Khan becoming successful members of the provincial and national assemblies.

His grandson, Omar, served in the Aziz ministry as a Finance Minister in the 2000s but joined the PML(N) in 2010; he was declared ineligible for the 2013 general election after allegations of vote rigging were proved. In 2018, he joined PTI. Another grandson, Yousaf, who is a party worker of the PTI, was also declared ineligible for submitting fake documents to the Election Commission.

Awards and decorations

Foreign Decorations

Honours

National honours

 :
  Recipient of the Nishan-e-Pakistan (NPk)
  Recipient of the Hilal-e-Jurat (HJ)
  Recipient of the Hilal-e-Pakistan (HPk)

Commonwealth honours

 :
  Member of the Most Excellent Order of the British Empire (MBE)
 :
  Honorary Knight Grand Cross of the Order of St Michael and St George (GCMG) (1961)
 :
  Honorary Recipient of the Order of the Crown of the Realm (D.M.N.(K)) (1962)

See also 

 Cold War
 Ayub National Park
 Ayub Medical College
 Americanism
 American cultural influence in Pakistan

Notes

Footnotes

References

Further reading

External links 

 Ayub Khan Bio
 Official profile at Pakistan Army website
 Video clip of Ayub Khan in Paris----use QuickTime Player.
 Video clip of Ayub Khan with General De Gaulle
 Video clip in Rawalpindi
  Creation as an Honorary Knight Grand Cross of the Order of St Michael and St George on 26 April 1960

|-

|-

|-

|-

|-

1907 births
1974 deaths
Hindkowan people
Pashtun people
People from Haripur District
Aligarh Muslim University alumni
Graduates of the Royal Military College, Sandhurst
British Indian Army officers
Punjab Regiment officers
Indian Members of the Order of the British Empire
Indian people of World War II
Indian Army personnel of World War II
Pakistan Muslim League politicians
Pakistani anti-communists
1950s in Pakistan
Pakistani generals
Commanders-in-Chief, Pakistan Army
Defence Ministers of Pakistan
Interior ministers of Pakistan
Leaders who took power by coup
Presidents of Pakistan
Field marshals
Pakistan Cricket Board Presidents and Chairmen
1960s in Pakistan
People of the Indo-Pakistani War of 1965
1965 controversies
Pakistani autobiographers
Pakistani financiers
Pakistani memoirists
Politicians with disabilities
Causes and prelude of the Bangladesh Liberation War
Recipients of Hilal-i-Jur'at
Recipients of the Nishan-e-Pakistan
Honorary Knights Grand Cross of the Order of St Michael and St George
20th-century Pakistani military personnel
20th-century Pakistani writers
.
Generals of the Indo-Pakistani War of 1965
20th-century memoirists
Pakistan Command and Staff College alumni